William Savage (1720–1789) was an English composer.

William, Willie, or Bill Savage may also refer to:

Politics
William Savage (MP for Appleby), (born before 1368), MP for Appleby in 1395
William Savage (14th century MP), for City of York
William Savage (c.1585-1627) for Winchester
William H. Savage, member of the California legislature

Sports
William Bruce Savage (born 1960), soccer player
Willie Savage (died 1961), Scottish footballer
Bill Savage (baseball), American baseball player

Others
William Savage (printer) (1770–1843), English printer and engraver
William Savage (ornithologist), English American ornithologist and painter
William Savage (Master of Emmanuel College, Cambridge) (died 1736)
Arthur William Savage (1857–1938), businessman
William Alfred Savage (1912–1942), English recipient of the Victoria Cross
William Dudley Savage (1920–2008), organist and broadcaster
Bill Savage, a fictional character in the British comic anthology 2000 AD
Will Savage, Hollyoaks character

See also
Murder of William Savage